Live at the BBC is a Live two disc compilation album featuring various line ups of the rock group Electric Light Orchestra (ELO). Released in 1999 and featuring various live BBC sessions as well as Live concert segments recorded by the BBC.

Track listing
Tracks 1-4 recorded at The Paris Theatre, Lower Regent Street, London, England on 19 April 1973; transmitted 12 May 1974.
Tracks 5-11 recorded at the Hippodrome, Golders Green, London, England on 25 January 1974; transmitted 2 February 1974.

Recorded at the Guildhall, Portsmouth, England on 22 June 1976; transmitted 6 November 1976.

References

BBC Radio recordings
Electric Light Orchestra live albums
Electric Light Orchestra compilation albums
1999 live albums
1999 compilation albums